is the 9th single by the Japanese girl idol group 9nine,  released in Japan on January 25, 2012, on the label SME Records (a subsidiary of Sony Music Entertainment Japan).

The physical CD single debuted at number 9 in the Oricon weekly singles chart.

Background 
The song "Shōjo Traveller" was an ending theme of the Japanese anime television series Beelzebub (in the episodes 49 to 59).

Release 
The single was released in four versions: three limited editions (Limited Edition A, Limited Edition B, and Limited Edition C) and a regular edition. All the limited editions included a bonus DVD. Each edition had a different cover.

Track listing

Charts

References

External links 
  (The video is available only in Japan.)
 Limited Edition A at Sony Music

2012 singles
Japanese-language songs
9nine songs
2012 songs
SME Records singles
Anime songs